Barry D. Ledger (born 19 January 1962 is an English former professional rugby league footballer who played in the 1980s and 1990s.

Background
Ledger was born in St Helens, Lancashire, England.

Playing career

International honours
Barry Ledger won a cap for England while at St. Helens in 1984 against Wales (sub), and won caps for Great Britain while at St. Helens in 1985 against France, and in 1986 against Australia.

Challenge Cup Final appearances
Barry Ledger played , i.e. number 2, in St. Helens' 18–19 defeat by Halifax in the 1987 Challenge Cup Final during the 1986–87 season at Wembley Stadium, London on Saturday 2 May 1987.

County Cup Final appearances
Barry Ledger played , i.e. number 2, in St. Helens 0–16 defeat by Warrington in the 1982 Lancashire County Cup Final during the 1982–83 season at Central Park, Wigan on Saturday 23 October 1982, and played  in the 28–16 victory over Wigan in the 1984 Lancashire County Cup Final during the 1984–85 season at Central Park, Wigan on Sunday 28 October 1984.

Honoured at St Helens R.F.C.
Ledger is a St Helens R.F.C. Hall of Fame inductee.

Spelling of the name
Barry was spelt wrong throughout the whole of his career spelt as 'Barrie' by the majority of press and the public. Since then it has been confirmed his name is spelt Barry

Genealogical information
Ledger is the son of the St. Helens and Rochdale Hornets  of the 1950s, Eric Ledger.

References

External links
Profile at saints.org.uk

1962 births
Living people
England national rugby league team players
English rugby league players
Great Britain national rugby league team players
Lancashire rugby league team players
Leigh Leopards players
Rugby league players from St Helens, Merseyside
Rugby league wingers
St Helens R.F.C. players